Lugassi (also spelled "Lugasi", "Lugassy", "Lugacy" or in some cases "Lugashi") is a Sephardic Jewish surname which originated in the Asturian town of . Jews mostly began to carry this name after the 1492 expulsion.

Notable people with the name include:

 Oshri Lugasi, Chief Combat Engineering Corps Officer of the IDF
 Daniella Lugassy, Israeli soprano opera singer
 Talia Lugacy, American film director, writer, producer, and a Screen Studies assistant professor.
 Gary Lugassy, French Tennis player
 Moti Lugasi, Israeli taekwando fighter
 Moshe Lugasi, Israeli footballer
 Moses Lugassy, 19th Century  Moroccan born British businessman and Zionist activist

References

Surnames
Jewish surnames
Sephardic surnames